Magic Bullet Records was an American independent record label specialising in punk rock, heavy metal and experimental music.

History
Magic Bullet records was founded in 1996 by Brent Eyestone, in order to release an album by Boysetsfire, entitled This Crying, This Screaming, My Voice Is Being Born. The label subsequently released over 140 recordings, including albums by Charles Manson, The All-American Rejects and This Will Destroy You. The label shut down at the end of 2017.

Artists signed with Magic Bullet

A City Safe From Sea
Aughra
Austin Lucas
Big China & Little Trouble
Cave In
Charles Manson
Christie Front Drive
Disappearer
Doomriders
Forensics
Ghastly City Sleep
Golden City
Integrity
INTRCPTR

Kaospilot
Lymbyc Systym
Made Out of Babies
Majority Rule
Meditative Sect
Rattler
Stephen Brodsky
Suppression
The All-American Rejects
The Wayward
This Will Destroy You
Wailin Storms
Valerian Swing
Years

Inactive bands
Jesuit
Loser Life
Corn on Macabre
Crimson Spectre
Old Man Gloom
Romance of Young Tigers

Compilation album
The label has released one compilation album, titled It Came from the Hills, Vol. 1. It was released February 28, 2006.

Track list
 Jinxed At Twelve: "The Bomba"
 Nitro Tokyo: "Fuel My Fire"
 Taint: "Poison Pen Attack"
 This Will Destroy You: "The World Is Our ___"
 Paul Michel: "Shoot First"
 Aughra: "Fostep"
 Stephen Brodsky: "Wintermean Crimes"
 Forensics: "Daytime Minutes"
 Tephra: "Through Our Veins"
 Light Yourself on Fire: "Rickshaw"
 Snowblood: "Aubade"
 Earthen Sea: "Sailing Toward Distant Lands"

References

American record labels